The Dutch Tea House is in the grounds of Eaton Hall, Cheshire, England.  It is recorded in the National Heritage List for England as a designated Grade II listed building.

The building was designed by the Chester architect John Douglas for the 2nd Earl Grosvenor (later the 1st Duke of Westminster) in 1872.  It stands at the north end of the Dutch Garden which was designed by C. E. Mallows.

The tea house has a cruciform plan.  It is a timber-framed building on a red sandstone plinth with a red tiled roof that rises with a concave profile to a point.  On the apex is a large lead finial with a small weather vane.  At the front is a verandah, the tearoom is in the centre and to the left, and the kitchen is on the right.  The wooden posts supporting the verandah are carved, and above these is a pargetted frieze.  A flight of six steps leads down to the Dutch Garden.

See also

Listed buildings in Eaton, Cheshire West and Chester
List of non-ecclesiastical and non-residential works by John Douglas

References

Grade II listed buildings in Cheshire
Cultural infrastructure completed in 1872
Eaton Hall, Dutch Tea House